Chaplynka Raion was one of the 18 administrative raions (a district) of Kherson Oblast in southern Ukraine. Its administrative center was located in the urban-type settlement of Chaplynka. The raion was abolished on 18 July 2020 as part of the administrative reform of Ukraine, which reduced the number of raions of Kherson Oblast to five. The area of Chaplynka Raion was merged into Kakhovka Raion. The last estimate of the raion population was 

At the time of disestablishment, the raion consisted of four hromadas:
 Askania-Nova settlement hromada with the administration in the urban-type settlement of Askania-Nova;
 Chaplynka settlement hromada with the administration in Chaplynka;
 Hryhorivka rural hromada with the administration in the selo of Hryhorivka;
 Khrestivka rural hromada with the administration in the selo of Khrestivka.

References

Former raions of Kherson Oblast
1923 establishments in the Soviet Union
Ukrainian raions abolished during the 2020 administrative reform